By the Sun's Rays is a 1914 American short silent Western film directed by Charles Giblyn and featuring Lon Chaney and Murdock MacQuarrie. It is one of the earliest surviving films of Lon Chaney, with several prints existing in private film collections and a video release in 1995. A still from the film exists showing Lon Chaney in the role of the villainous "Frank Lawlor".

Plot 
A gang of bandits keeps robbing the gold shipments from a Colorado mining company each time one is sent out. A detective named John Murdock is asked to assist mine superintendent John Davis in finding the culprits. The office clerk, Frank Lawler (Chaney), is in love with Davis' daughter Dora but his advances are rejected by the girl who loves Murdock instead. After another shipment arrives, Murdock assembles a posse. He discovers that Lawler has been sneaking out of the office and using a mirror to signal the bandits to alert them to the arrival of the gold shipments.

With the town's men off in the woods, Lawler attempts to molest Dora in the mining office and she tries to hold him off until help arrives. After the bandits are arrested, the posse returns to the office, and Murdock catches Lawler in the act of assaulting Dora. Murdock produces the mirror from Lawler's desk drawer, and accuses him of complicity with the robberies. Lawler attempts to escape but he is shot dead in the street by one of the deputies. Murdock winds up getting the girl.

Cast
 Murdock MacQuarrie as Detective John Murdock
 Lon Chaney as Frank Lawler, the clerk
 Seymour Hastings as John Davis
 Agnes Vernon as Dora Davis
 Richard (Dick) Rosson as a bandit
 Eddie Lyons

Reception
Moving Picture World called it "A western number of about average interest". Motion Picture News stated: "An old plot but the novel manner in which it is worked makes it interesting....The picture will appeal more to lovers of westerns than others".

References

External links
 
 

1914 films
1914 Western (genre) films
1914 short films
American silent short films
American black-and-white films
Films directed by Charles Giblyn
Silent American Western (genre) films
Universal Pictures short films
1910s American films